North Hyde Park is an unincorporated village and census-designated place (CDP) in the towns of Hyde Park and Johnson, Lamoille County, Vermont, United States. The CDP was first drawn for the 2020 census. North Hyde Park has a post office with ZIP code 05665, which opened on May 29, 1839.

Geography

Portions of the CDP extend west into the town of Johnson and north into the town of Eden. Via the Gihon River, the community is part of the Lamoille River watershed, flowing west to Lake Champlain.

References

Unincorporated communities in Lamoille County, Vermont
Unincorporated communities in Vermont
Census-designated places in Lamoille County, Vermont
Census-designated places in Vermont